Guillermo Durán and Felipe Meligeni Alves were the defending champions but chose not to defend their title.

Guido Andreozzi and Ignacio Carou won the title after defeating Leonardo Aboian and Ignacio Monzón 5–7, 6–4, [10–5] in the final.

Seeds

Draw

References

External links
 Main draw

Challenger de Tigre - Doubles